Ian Anderson (11 September 1954 – 5 November 2008) was a Scottish professional football defender who spent most of his career playing in the United States.

Anderson began his professional career with Dundee when he was sixteen, his debut with the first team coming in August 1972.  He moved to St Johnstone in December 1975. St Johnstone sent him on loan in 1977 to the Tampa Bay Rowdies of the North American Soccer League.  In 1978, the Rowdies traded the American rights to Anderson to the Houston Hurricane in exchange for draft picks.  Houston then purchased his contract from St Johnstone.  That fall, the Houston Summit became a member of the Major Indoor Soccer League.  The team was essentially the Houston Hurricane in an indoor guise. He was a 1978–1979 MISL All Star with Houston.

When both the Hurricane and Summit collapsed in 1980, Anderson signed with the Cleveland Force of MISL.  In December 1980, the Rowdies selected Anderson in the NASL Dispersal Draft which included players from the disbanded Hurricane.  While the team wanted him for the NASL indoor season, he remained with the Force for the rest of the season, garnering first team All Star honors.  He returned to the Rowdies for the 1981 outdoor season before moving indoors permanently that fall with the Force.

On January 6, 1982, the New Jersey Rockets purchased Anderson from the Cleveland Force. and in February 1982, Anderson replaced the fired Timo Liekoski as head coach of the New Jersey Rockets.  In 1983, he moved to the Wichita Wings, where he played two seasons.  In October 1985, he signed with the Canton Invaders of the American Indoor Soccer Association.  In 1986–1987, he coached the Kansas Argyles, an independent indoor soccer team.

Anderson died suddenly on 5 November 2008 at Western General Hospital in Edinburgh, leaving behind his wife Jacqueline, two adult children Justin and Keri, and a granddaughter named Grace. His funeral service was held one week later in Mortonhall Crematorium Pentland Chapel, Edinburgh.

References

External links
NASL stats
Career overview

1954 births
2008 deaths
American Indoor Soccer Association players
Canton Invaders (AISA) players
Canton Invaders players
Cleveland Force (original MISL) players
Dundee F.C. players
Houston Hurricane players
Houston Summit players
Major Indoor Soccer League (1978–1992) coaches
Major Indoor Soccer League (1978–1992) players
New Jersey Rockets (MISL) players
North American Soccer League (1968–1984) indoor players
North American Soccer League (1968–1984) players
Scottish footballers
Footballers from Edinburgh
Scottish expatriate footballers
St Johnstone F.C. players
Tampa Bay Rowdies (1975–1993) players
Wichita Wings (MISL) players
St. Louis Steamers (original MISL) players
Association football defenders
Scottish expatriate sportspeople in the United States
Expatriate soccer players in the United States
Scottish football managers